The 2009 National Camogie League is a competition in the women's team field sport of camogie was won by Wexford, who defeated Tipperary in the final, played at Parnell Park, Dublin.

Arrangements
The seven teams in the first division were placed in two groups and the top two in each group qualified for the semi-finals.

The Final
Wexford full forward Una Leacy scored two goals before half time to give her team a 2-6 to 0-5 lead at the interval, sending Wexford to their first league since 1977, defeating Tipperary 2-12 to 0-11. Captain Aoife O'Connor delayed her honeymoon to lead out her side. After the match Aoife O'Connor said: "We've probably been knocking on the door for around 10 or 12 years with various teams coming through, but it's the first time we've actually managed to get across the line, so that's fantastic,"

Division 2
The Division 2 final, known until 2005 as the National Junior League, was won by Wexford who defeated Antrim in the final. Antrim had won the Division Three title 12 months ago, 2-10 to 0-11. Scores were level six times before Wexford pulled away in the closing quarter thanks to a 1-4 total contribution from Ciara O’Connor – one of three sisters on the team and a sibling to Division One skipper Aoife. Antrim captain Jane Adams scored eight points. The Division 3 final was won by Down who defeated Laois in the final.

Final stages

MATCH RULES
60 minutes
Replay if scores level
Maximum of 5 substitutions

References

2009
National Camogie League, 2009